Measures 66 and 67 are two ballot referendums that were on the  special election ballot in the US state of Oregon, which proposed tax increases on corporations and on households making US$250,000 and individuals making $125,000 to help balance the state's budget. They were approved and became effective .

Background 
The recession that greatly affected the American economy starting in late 2008 caused a budget shortfall in Oregon that the state legislature had to make up for. A critical factor in this process was that the 2008 general election gave Democrats a three-fifths majority in both chambers of the legislature, which is the supermajority needed to pass any bills calling for revenue increases. Among other actions, the legislature passed House Bills 2649 and 3405, raising taxes on corporations and on wealthy individuals and households, respectively. Some Oregon citizens started a drive to force a referendum on these bills, believing they would hurt the state's economy.

While 55,179 valid signatures from registered voters on each referendum petition were needed to qualify the referendum for the ballot,
about 99,000 valid signatures were filed. Don Hamilton, spokesman for the Oregon Secretary of State's office, remarked that "it's unusually high for a statewide ballot measure." On , the Secretary of State's office announced that both measures qualified for the  ballot.

Campaign
Businesses largely opposed the two measures, with groups such as the Associated Oregon Industries campaigning against both.  The top individual donor was Phil Knight of Nike, who gave $150,000. 
 
The yes vote was supported by educators and public employee unions. Politically, the Oregon Democratic Party supported the measures while the Oregon Republican Party opposed the measures. The campaigns for and against these measures spent the second most money ever waged on a ballot measure campaign in the state. Only Ballot Measure 50 in 2007 was more expensive than the $12.5 million spent on the yes and no campaigns of Measures 66 and 67.

Results

Notes

See also 

 List of Oregon ballot measures
 Oregon tax revolt

References

External links 
 Oregon Measures 66 and 67 on Ballotpedia.

2010 Oregon ballot measures
Taxation in Oregon